Badreddine Assouar (born May 5, 1974) is a physicist, currently Director of Research at CNRS and the University of Lorraine in France. His research focuses on metamaterials, metasurfaces, phononic crystals and SAW devices.
He is an Associate Editor of Physical Review Applied.

Career 
Badreddine Assouar received his master's degree in 1998, his PhD in 2001 and his Habilitation to Supervise Research in 2007 from the University of Lorraine in France.
After a postdoctoral fellowship, he entered to the French National Center of Scientific Research (CNRS) in 2002.
From 2010 to 2012, he joined the Georgia Institute of Technology in Atlanta as a visiting Professor in the international research unit (CNRS – Georgia Tech). In 2020, he became Director of Research at CNRS. He is the founder and the head of the “Metamaterials and Phononics” group at the Institut Jean Lamour (CNRS-University of Lorraine).

Honors and awards 
In 2009, he received the first research prize from the Lorraine region.
In 2013, he won the Award of Scientific Excellence from CNRS.

References 

1974 births
Living people
University of Lorraine alumni
Academic staff of the University of Lorraine
Research directors of the French National Centre for Scientific Research
Metamaterials scientists
21st-century French physicists